Aleksandar Antonov Tonev; born 3 February 1990 is a retired Bulgarian professional footballer who last played as a winger for Botev Plovdiv.

He began his career at CSKA Sofia, also spending a season on loan at Sliven 2000 before joining the Polish Ekstraklasa club Lech Poznań in 2011. In his second season, he inspired them to runners-up position in the league, and was signed by Aston Villa. In 2014, Villa loaned him to Celtic, and then sold him to Frosinone the following year. He spent one year there before transferring to fellow Serie A team Crotone.

A full international since 2011, Tonev has earned over 30 caps for the different national sides of Bulgaria.

Club career

CSKA Sofia 

Born in Elin Pelin, Sofia Province, Tonev was raised in CSKA Sofia's youth teams. He made his first team debut in a 3–1 league win over Belasitsa Petrich on 8 March 2008, coming on as a substitute for Chigozie Udoji. Tonev got his chance in CSKA's first team after the sale of many players in the summer of 2008. He played in the club's first fixture in the 2008–09 season against Litex Lovech on 3 August 2008. His team won the game and won the Bulgarian Supercup for the third time.

After Lyuboslav Penev replaced Dimitar Penev as head coach of CSKA Sofia, Tonev appeared in the match groups more often and often came in as a substitute for his team. On 22 April 2009, Tonev scored his first 2 goals for CSKA, securing a brace in the 4–1 away win against Vihren Sandanski.

He was loaned to OFC Sliven 2000 for the 2009–10 season, where he was likely to receive more chances to play. He was recalled from his loan to the team from Sliven for the 2010–11 season.

Lech Poznań 

On 16 June 2011 Tonev signed with Polish Ekstraklasa club Lech Poznań. He made his debut on 29 July 2011, coming on in 75th minute, replacing Jakub Wilk in a game against ŁKS Łódź. Lech Poznań won the game 5–0.

On 26 July 2012, Tonev scored his first ever European goal, netting the only goal in a 1–0 home victory over Azerbaijani club Khazar Lankaran in the second qualifying round of Europa League. On 25 August, Tonev netted his first Ekstraklasa goal of the 2012–13 season as he scored a 25-yard winning strike in a 2–1 away victory over Polonia Warsaw.

Aston Villa 
On 7 June 2013, Tonev signed for Aston Villa as their first signing of the pre-season. He was recommended by former international teammate Stiliyan Petrov, a development coach at the club. He made his debut on 13 August, replacing Karim El Ahmadi for the final eight minutes of a 2–1 defeat away to Chelsea, making 17 Premier League appearances in total throughout the season.

Celtic 
On 11 August 2014, Tonev moved to Scottish champions Celtic on a season-long loan deal, with an option to buy. He made his debut on 13 September, starting in a 2–1 home win over Aberdeen.  Aberdeen full-back Shay Logan accused Tonev of having racially abused him during this match; Tonev denies the allegations. On 30 October 2014, Tonev was given a seven-match ban for "using abusive language of a racist nature". Celtic confirmed that they would appeal the decision, as they believe him to be innocent. Tonev then lost his appeal and Celtic decided not to take the matter any further.

Frosinone 
On 27 August 2015, Tonev joined Serie A newcomers Frosinone on a permanent deal. He played his first game three days later, coming on as a substitute for Luca Paganini in a 2–0 loss against Atalanta at Stadio Atleti Azzurri d'Italia.

Crotone 
On 16 July 2016, Tonev joined Serie A newcomers Crotone. He scored his first goal for the club in a 0–1 away win over Pescara on 7 May 2017.

Retirement
Tonev announced his retirement from football in March 2022, 20 months after his last official game and started his own construction business.

International career 
On 4 September 2009, Tonev scored his first goal for the Bulgaria U21 in the 3–0 home win against Kazakhstan U21 in a UEFA European Under-21 Football Championship qualifier. On 9 September 2009, he was sent off for a dangerous tackle on Guillermo Molins in the 90th minute of the 1–2 away loss to Sweden U21. On 9 February 2011, Tonev scored a goal in a friendly match against Cameroon.

Tonev made his debut for the Bulgarian national team in a 0–1 home loss against Wales on 11 October 2011. On 22 March 2013, he scored his first international goals as he netted a hat-trick (the first one in his career) during a 6–0 home win over Malta in the World Cup 2014 qualifying match.

Three years and a week later, he scored his first international goal since the hat-trick, to conclude a 2–0 win over neighbours Macedonia in Skopje.

Career statistics

Club

International

International goals
Scores and results list Bulgaria's goal tally first.

References

External links 

 
 
 
 

1990 births
Living people
Sportspeople from Sofia Province
Bulgarian footballers
Bulgaria international footballers
First Professional Football League (Bulgaria) players
PFC CSKA Sofia players
OFC Sliven 2000 players
Lech Poznań players
Aston Villa F.C. players
Celtic F.C. players
Frosinone Calcio players
F.C. Crotone players
Botev Plovdiv players
Association football midfielders
Bulgarian expatriate sportspeople in Poland
Expatriate footballers in Poland
Expatriate footballers in England
Bulgarian expatriates in the United Kingdom
Premier League players
Expatriate footballers in Scotland
Scottish Professional Football League players
Bulgarian expatriates in Italy
Expatriate footballers in Italy
Serie A players
Race-related controversies in the United Kingdom